(born 20 August 1965 in Sagamihara, Kanagawa) is a Japanese manga story writer, best known for co-creating, with Seimaru Amagi and Fumiya Sato, the Kindaichi Case Files series.

He made his debut in 1991 with manga Chōzunō Silver Wolf (illustrated by Masashi Asaki).

Works 
Chōzunō Silver Wolf (debut work) 
Gimmick!
Kindaichi Case Files (with Seimaru Amagi and Fumiya Satō)
Mystery Minzokugakusha Yakumo Itsuki

References

External links 
 
 

Living people
1965 births
Japanese screenwriters
Winner of Kodansha Manga Award (Shōnen)
People from Sagamihara